Devu Thapa (born February 7, 1974 in Jumla) is a Nepalese judoka, who played for the light middleweight category. At age thirty-four, Thapa made her official debut for the 2008 Summer Olympics in Beijing, where she competed in the women's 63 kg class. She lost her first preliminary match to Chinese Taipei's Wang Chin-Fang, who was able to score an automatic ippon at twenty-two seconds.

References

External links
 

NBC Olympics Profile

1974 births
Living people
People from Jumla District
Nepalese female judoka
Olympic judoka of Nepal
Judoka at the 2008 Summer Olympics
Judoka at the 2006 Asian Games
Asian Games competitors for Nepal
Olympic athletes of Nepal
21st-century Nepalese women

DEVA THAPA CAREER